General Charles Stanhope, 3rd Earl of Harrington  (17 March 17535 September 1829), styled Viscount Petersham until 1779, was a British Army officer and politician who sat in the House of Commons between 1774 and 1779 when he succeeded to the peerage as Earl of Harrington.

Early life

Stanhope was the son of William Stanhope, 2nd Earl of Harrington, and Lady Caroline FitzRoy, daughter of Charles FitzRoy, 2nd Duke of Grafton, and Lady Henrietta Somerset, daughter of Charles Somerset, Marquess of Worcester, and Rebecca Child. He was educated at Eton.

Military career
Stanhope was commissioned into the Coldstream Guards in 1769. During the Saratoga campaign of the American Revolutionary War as Viscount Petersham, he commanded the 29th Regiment of Foot's Grenadier company and was an aide-de-camp to General John Burgoyne.

He was Colonel of the 85th Regiment of Foot (1778–1783), the 65th Regiment of Foot (1783–1788) and the 29th Regiment of Foot (1788–1792). He was finally Colonel of the 1st Life Guards from 1792 to his death. He was promoted full general in 1803 and made GCH in 1821. From 1805 to 1812 he was Commander-in-Chief, Ireland, and he was sent on diplomatic errands to Vienna and to Berlin.

Viscount Petersham can be seen in the famous painting "The Burial of General Fraser at Saratoga" standing above Simon Fraser.

Parliamentary career
He was briefly elected to serve as Member of Parliament for Thetford in 1774 and then sat from 1776 to 1779 as one of the members for Westminster.

Family

Lord Harrington was married to Jane Fleming, daughter of Sir John Fleming, 1st Baronet. She was a Lady of the Bedchamber to Queen Charlotte. Lord and Lady Harrington had eleven children:

Charles Stanhope, 4th Earl of Harrington (8 April 17803 March 1851). He was married to Maria Foote, daughter of Samuel Foote.
Maj-Gen. Hon. Lincoln Edwin Robert Stanhope (26 November 178129 February 1840).
Anna Maria Stanhope, Duchess of Bedford (3 September 17833 July 1857). She was married to Francis Russell, 7th Duke of Bedford.
Leicester FitzGerald Charles Stanhope, 5th Earl of Harrington (2 September 17847 September 1862). He married Elizabeth Green, daughter of William Green and Ann Rose Hall.
Hon. William Sefton George Stanhope (29 December 1785February 1786)
Rev. Hon. FitzRoy Henry Richard Stanhope (24 April 178711 April 1864). Dean of St Buryan, Cornwall and rector of Catton and of Wressle in Yorkshire. He married Caroline Wyndham, illegitimate daughter of the Hon. Charles Wyndham. They were parents of Charles Wyndham Stanhope, 7th Earl of Harrington, his younger brother Percy Stanhope and of several other children.
Maj. Hon. Sir Francis Charles Stanhope (29 September 17889 October 1862). He had three children by Hannah Wilson, daughter of James Wilson of Parsonstown Manor, County Meath.
Rev. Hon. Henry William Stanhope (2 August 179021 June 1872). Rector of Gawsworth.
Lady Caroline Anne Stanhope (20 November 179125 November 1853), married Edward Ayshford Sanford on 21 June 1841.
Lady Charlotte Augusta Stanhope (15 February 179315 February 1859), married Augustus Frederick FitzGerald, 3rd Duke of Leinster on 16 June 1818. They were parents to Charles William FitzGerald, 4th Duke of Leinster and another three children.
Hon. Augustus Henry Edward Stanhope (25 March 17948 December 1831). On 8 May 1813, he married Jane Baldwin in the Parish Church of St John, Hampstead, under the name "Edward Stanhope" and disguised as a groom or labourer.  The marriage was annulled in 1822 by reason of undue publication of banns (26 Geo. 2 c. 33).

References

External links

Worcestershire Regiment website bio, with picture

1753 births
1829 deaths
People educated at Eton College
British Army personnel of the American Revolutionary War
British Army generals
British Life Guards officers
Commanders-in-Chief, Ireland
3
Petersham, Charles Stanhope, Viscount
British MPs 1768–1774
British MPs 1774–1780
Members of the Privy Council of Great Britain
Members of the Privy Council of Ireland
29th Regiment of Foot officers
Worcestershire Regiment officers
Charles
Coldstream Guards officers